Helen Edwards may refer to

 Helen T. Edwards (1936–2016), American physicist
 Helen Edwards (civil servant) (born 1953), British civil servant
 Helen Edwards (artist) (1882–1963), British artist

See also
 Edwards (surname)